The Liévin Congress was the seventeenth national congress of the French Socialist Party (Parti socialiste or PS). It took place from 18 to 20 November 1994. It took place shortly after the PS' defeat in the 1994 European elections.

Results

Henri Emmanuelli was elected as First Secretary.

References

Congresses of the Socialist Party (France)
1994 in France
1994 in politics
1994 conferences